The Bishop to His Majesty's Prisons is an episcopal post in the Church of England relating to the church's chaplaincy to His Majesty's Prison Service. The bishop holds this role alongside their diocesan or suffragan see and works to support the Chaplain-General of Prisons.

List of bishops

See also

Chaplain-General of Prisons

References